This list is of the Historic Sites of Japan located within the Prefecture of Fukushima.

National Historic Sites
As of 17 December 2021, fifty-four Sites have been designated as being of national significance.

| align="center"|Tennōyama SiteTennōyama iseki || Shirakawa || || ||  || || 
|-
| align="center"|Kashiwagi Castle SiteKashiwagi-jō ato || Kitashiobara || || ||  || || 
|-
|}

Prefectural Historic Sites
As of 1 June 2021, forty-six Sites have been designated as being of prefectural importance.

Municipal Historic Sites
As of 1 May 2021, a further three hundred and thirty-nine Sites have been designated at a municipal level.

Registered Historic Sites
As of 1 December 2021, one Monument has been registered (as opposed to designated) as an Historic Site at a national level.

See also

 Cultural Properties of Japan
 Mutsu Province
 Fukushima Museum
 List of Cultural Properties of Japan - paintings (Fukushima)
 List of Places of Scenic Beauty of Japan (Fukushima)

References

External links
  Cultural Properties in Fukushima Prefecture

Fukushima Prefecture
 Fukushima